Orion Mall is a shopping mall at Brigade Gateway Enclave in Bangalore, Karnataka, India developed by Brigade Group (Developer). The mall with a total shopping area of 8.2 Lakh sq.ft. is the 3rd largest in Bangalore.

About 
Orion Mall is part of a premium integrated enclave known as Brigade Gateway which houses World Trade Center, Sheraton Grand Hotel, Columbia Asia Hospital apart from the mall in its premises. Orion Mall has four floors of retail space which include shopping zones, a multiplex, food and beverage stores, and bowling & gaming zones.

Entertainment and leisure 
Places for entertainment and leisure activities in the mall are:

 11-screen, 2,800-seat capacity, excluding 144-seat gold class screens PVR Cinemas multiplex 

 Time Zone, an 8000 sq-ft gaming zone

Food and dining
Food court is spread over an area of 60,000 sq-ft which is known as Sauce Pan. It houses several food stalls among which are Beijing bites, Empire, Fish & chips, Kailash parbat, Mangalore express, McDonald's, Rajdhani, Sbarro, Subway, Sukh sagar, Yogurberry, Chili's American Grill & Bar and KFC. There are various restaurants like Toscano and YouMee on the ground floor of orion.

Events
Orion mall hosted an automobile exhibition Fuel Auto Expo 2014 organised by Pulse events from 7 to 9 March 2014 featuring cars and bikes from leading manufacturers, vehicle accessories along with other events such as vintage car show and bike stunts.
 In September 2012, Indian Air Force organised an exhibition at the mall to showcase its capabilities. The expo included several events, such as flight simulators, life-sized models of aircraft, air-warriors performing drills and IAF themed arcade game.

References 

Shopping malls in Bangalore
Shopping malls established in 2012
2012 establishments in Karnataka